Players and pairs who neither have high enough rankings nor receive wild cards may participate in a qualifying tournament held one week before the annual Wimbledon Tennis Championships.

Seeds

  Marta Marrero (second round)
  Magdalena Grzybowska (qualified)
  Rossana de los Ríos (qualified)
  Giulia Casoni (qualified)
  Lina Krasnoroutskaya (qualified)
  Francesca Schiavone (first round)
  Shinobu Asagoe (qualified)
  Jennifer Hopkins (second round)
  Vanessa Webb (qualifying competition)
  Iroda Tulyaganova (first round)
  Tatiana Poutchek (second round)
  Pavlina Nola (qualifying competition)
  Janet Lee (second round)
  Meilen Tu (qualifying competition)
  Brie Rippner (qualified)
  Anna Földényi (second round)
  Émilie Loit (second round)
  Annabel Ellwood (first round)
  Mashona Washington (qualified)
  Martina Suchá (qualifying competition)
  Yuka Yoshida (qualified)
  Rachel McQuillan (qualifying competition)
  Eva Dyrberg (second round)
  Lenka Němečková (first round)

Qualifiers

  Yuka Yoshida
  Magdalena Grzybowska
  Rossana de los Ríos
  Giulia Casoni
  Lina Krasnoroutskaya
  Gréta Arn
  Shinobu Asagoe
  Yvette Basting
  Dája Bedáňová
  Melanie Schnell
  Mashona Washington
  Brie Rippner

Qualifying draw

First qualifier

Second qualifier

Third qualifier

Fourth qualifier

Fifth qualifier

Sixth qualifier

Seventh qualifier

Eighth qualifier

Ninth qualifier

Tenth qualifier

Eleventh qualifier

Twelfth qualifier

External links

2000 Wimbledon Championships on WTAtennis.com
2000 Wimbledon Championships – Women's draws and results at the International Tennis Federation

Women's Singles Qualifying
Wimbledon Championship by year – Women's singles qualifying
Wimbledon Championships